Schinia regia is a moth of the family Noctuidae. It is found in North America, including Colorado, Kansas, Nebraska, Oklahoma, New Mexico and Texas.

The wingspan is 25–30 mm. Adults are on wing from September to October.

The larvae feed on Vernonia texana.

External links
Images
Bug Guide
A Review of the Schinia regia species complex

Schinia
Moths of North America
Moths described in 1876